Polyamory is the practice of, or desire for, romantic relationships with more than one partner at the same time, with the informed consent of all partners involved. People who identify as polyamorous may believe in open relationships with a conscious management of jealousy and reject the view that sexual and relational exclusivity are prerequisite for deep, committed, long-term, loving relationships. Others prefer to restrict their sexual activity to only members of the group, a closed polyamorous relationship that is usually referred to as polyfidelity.

Polyamory has come to be an umbrella term for various forms of non-monogamous, multi-partner relationships, or non-exclusive sexual or romantic relationships. Its usage reflects the choices and philosophies of the individuals involved, but with recurring themes or values, such as love, intimacy, honesty, integrity, equality, communication, and commitment.  It can sometimes be distinguished from some other forms of ethical non-monogamy in that the relationships involved are loving intimate relationships, as opposed to purely sexual relationships.

Terminology

The word polyamorous first appeared in an article by Morning Glory Zell-Ravenheart, "A Bouquet of Lovers", published in May 1990 in Green Egg Magazine, as "poly-amorous". In May 1992, Jennifer L. Wesp created the Usenet newsgroup alt.polyamory, and the Oxford English Dictionary (OED) cites the proposal to create that group as the first verified appearance of the word. In 1999, Zell-Ravenheart was asked by the editor of the OED to provide a definition of the term, and she provided it for the UK version as "the practice, state or ability of having more than one sexual loving relationship at the same time, with the full knowledge and consent of all partners involved." The words polyamory, polyamorous, and polyamorist were added to the OED in 2006.

Some reference works define "polyamory" as a relational form (whether interpersonal or romantic or sexual) that involves multiple people with the consent of all the people involved, like Oxford Living Dictionaries, Cambridge Advanced Learner's Dictionary & Thesaurus, and Dictionary.com. Some criticized the Merriam-Webster definition of polyamory, which defines the term as "the state or practice of having more than one open romantic relationship at a time," as missing a "vital component": consent.

The word polyamory combines the Greek word for many (poly) and the Latin word for love (amor).

As a practice

Consensual non-monogamy, which polyamory falls under, can take many different forms, depending on the needs and preferences of the individual(s) involved in any specific relationship(s). As of 2019, over one fifth of the United States population has, at some point in their lives, engaged in some sort of consensual non-monogamy.

Separate from polyamory as a philosophical basis for relationships are the practical ways in which people who live polyamorously arrange their lives and handle certain issues, as compared to those of a more conventional monogamous arrangement. People of different sexual orientations are a part of the community and form networks of relationships, with consent and agreement of their partners. Many things differentiate polyamory from other types of non-monogamous relationships. It is common for swinging and open couples to maintain emotional monogamy while engaging in extra-dyadic sexual relations. 

The friend or partner boundary in monogamous relationships and other forms of non-monogamy is typically fairly clear. Unlike other forms of non-monogamy, though, "polyamory is notable for privileging emotional intimacy with others." Benefits of a polyamorous relationship might include: the ability of individuals to discuss issues with multiple partners, potentially mediating and thus stabilizing a relationship, and reducing polarization of viewpoints, and emotional support and structure from other committed adults within the familial unit. Other benefits include a wider range of adult experience, skills, resources, and perspective and support for companionate marriages, which can be satisfying even if no longer sexually vital, since romantic needs are met elsewhere. This acts to preserve existing relationships. A final benefit is more emotional, intellectual and sexual needs met as part of the understanding that one person cannot be expected to provide them all. Conversely, polyamory offers release from the monogamist expectation that one person must meet all of an individual's needs (sex, emotional support, primary friendship, intellectual stimulation, companionship, social presentation).

Polyamorous communities are present in countries within Europe, North America, Oceania, South America, Asia, and Africa. The Kinsey Institute for Research in Sex, Gender and Reproduction estimating that there were half-a-million "openly polyamorous families" in the United States in July 2009. Additionally, 15–28% of heterosexual couples and about half of gay and bisexual people have a "non-traditional" arrangement of some kind as reported in The Guardian in August 2013. Polyamorous communities have been said to be outwardly feminist as women were central to the creation of such communities and gender equality is a central tenet. For those who are polyamorous, social distancing, as a result of the COVID-19 pandemic, created ripples in existing relationships, leading some to split apart and others to struggle to maintain their connections with one another.

Values

Fidelity and loyalty 

A large percentage of polyamorists define fidelity not as sexual exclusivity, but as faithfulness to the promises and agreements made about a relationship. As a relational practice, polyamory sustains a vast variety of open relationship or multi-partner constellations, which can differ in definition and grades of intensity, closeness and commitment. Specifically, 
polyamory can take the forms of a triad of three people in an intimate relationship, a poly family of more than three people, one person as the pivot point of a relationship (a "vee"), a couple in a two-person relationship which portrays other relationships on their own, and various other intimate networks of individuals. There are also those who are swingers and engage in polyamory, or engage in poly-dating. A poly family is sometimes called "kitchen table polyamory", a style of polyamory in which all members of a particular polycule are comfortable and connected enough with each other that it is not uncommon for them to literally gather around the kitchen table, as they may spend holidays, birthdays, or other important times together as a large group. This style places an emphasis on family-style connections, and not all members are necessarily sexually or romantically involved with every other person in the group. Other styles of polyamory include parallel polyamory, where members of individual relationships prefer not to meet or know details of their partners' other relationships, and solo polyamory, in which the individual has or is comfortable with having multiple intimate (romantic or sexual) relationships without wanting to cohabit or "nest" with any one partner, eschewing the "relationship escalator" which holds that relationships must follow a progression, or "escalator" from dating, to being exclusive, to becoming engaged, getting married, and having children. For some, polyamory functions as an umbrella term for the multiple approaches of 'responsible non-monogamy'. A secret sexual relationship that violates those accords would be seen as a breach of fidelity. Polyamorists generally base definitions of commitment on considerations other than sexual exclusivity, e.g. "trust and honesty" or "growing old together". In an article in Men's Health, Zachary Zane states that commitment in a polyamorous relationship means that "you will be there for that person", supporting them, taking care of them, and loving them.

Communication and negotiation 
Because there is no "standard model" for polyamorous relationships, and reliance upon common expectations may not be realistic, polyamorists advocate explicitly negotiating with all involved to establish the terms of their relationships, and often emphasize that this should be an ongoing process of honest communication and respect. Polyamorists typically take a pragmatic approach to their relationships; many accept that sometimes they and their partners will make mistakes and fail to live up to these ideals, and that communication is important for repairing any breaches. They also argue that polyamory is a response to challenges of relationships of a monogamous nature.

Trust, honesty, dignity, and respect 
Polyamory has been defined as loving more than one person at once, with respect, trust, and honesty for all partners involved. Ideally, a partner's partners are accepted as part of that person's life rather than merely tolerated, and usually a relationship that requires deception or a "don't ask don't tell" policy is seen as a less than ideal model.
Out additionally described polyamory as "not a sexuality" but as actually "having multiple intimate relationships".

Non-possessiveness 
Some polyamorists view excessive restrictions on other deep relationships as less than desirable, as such restrictions can be used to replace trust with a framework of ownership and control. It is usually preferred or encouraged that a polyamorist strive to view their partners' other significant others, often referred to as metamours or OSOs, in terms of the gain to their partners' lives rather than a threat to their own (see compersion). Therefore, jealousy and possessiveness are generally viewed not so much as something to avoid or structure the relationships around, but as responses that should be explored, understood, and resolved within each individual, with compersion as a goal. This is related to one of the types of polyamory, which is non-hierarchical, where "no one relationship is prioritized above the rest" and the fact that polyamorists insist on working through problems in their relationships "through open communication, patience, and honesty."

Compersion

Compersion is an empathetic state of happiness and joy experienced when another individual experiences happiness and joy. In the context of polyamorous relationships, it describes positive feelings experienced by an individual when their intimate partner is enjoying another relationship. Some have called it "the opposite or flip side of jealousy," said it is analogous to the "joy parents feel when their children get married," and a "positive emotional reaction to a lover's other relationship." The concept of compersion was originally coined by the Kerista Commune in San Francisco.

Difficulties
Morin (1999) and Fleckenstein (2014) noted that certain conditions are favorable to good experiences with polyamory, but that these differ from the general population. Heavy public promotion of polyamory can have the unintended effect of attracting people to it for whom it is not well-suited. Unequal power-dynamics, such as financial dependence, can also inappropriately influence a person to agree to a polyamorous relationship against their true desires. Even in more equal power-dynamic relationships, the reluctant partner may feel coerced into a proposed non-monogamous arrangement due to the implication that if they refuse, the proposer will pursue other partners anyway, will break off the relationship, or that the one refusing will be accused of intolerance.

Polyamorous relationships present practical pitfalls. One common complaint from participants is time management, as more partners means one must divide one's time and attention up between them, leaving less for each. Related is that the complexity of the arrangement can lead to so much effort being spent on the relationship that personal, individual needs can be overlooked. The strong emphasis on communication can unintentionally marginalize partners who are less articulate. Finally, negotiating the sometimes complex rules and boundaries of these relationships can be emotionally taxing, as can reconciling situations where one partner goes outside those boundaries. Some therapists argue that polyamory is not good for relationships, saying it is a "recipe for hurt, disappointment, jealousy, and breakups".

Legal issues and legal recognition

In 1998, a Tennessee court granted guardianship of a child to her grandmother and step-grandfather, after the child's mother April Divilbiss and partners outed themselves as polyamorous on MTV. After contesting the decision for two years, Divilbiss eventually agreed to relinquish her daughter, acknowledging that she was unable to adequately care for her child and that this, rather than her polyamory, had been the grandparents' real motivation in seeking custody.

In 2010, Ann Tweedy, a legal scholar, argued that polyamory could be considered a sexual orientation under existing United States law. This argument was opposed by Christian Keese, who wrote in 2016 that advocating a "sexual orientation model of polyamory is likely to reduce the complexity and transformative potential of poly intimacies," while also limiting the reach and scope of possible litigation, obstructing the ability of poly activists to form alliances with other groups, and increasing the possibility that poly activists will have to settle for legal solutions which are "exclusive and reproductive of a culture of privilege".

In 2016, writer Rebecca Ruth Gould called for non-monogamy, including polyamory, to receive "the legal recognition it deserves", saying that polyamory remains a "negative identity".

In 2017, three men became the first family in the state of California to have names of three fathers on their child's birth certificate. In later years, they had legal challenges and in 2020 published a book about their experiences titled Three Dads and a Baby.

In June 2018, a court in Newfoundland and Labrador recognized three unmarried adults as legal parents of a child who was born within the polyamorous family they had formed; this was believed to be a first for Canadian law. The three adults included the child's mother and two men; the child's biological father was unknown.

In June 2020, the city council of Somerville, Massachusetts, voted to recognize polyamorous domestic partnerships in the city, becoming the first American city to do so. This measure was passed so that those in a polyamorous relationship would have access to their partners' health insurance amid the COVID-19 pandemic.

In November 2020, the issue of polyamory came to the Supreme Court of Vermont in the form of a dispute between two men and a woman in a polyamorous relationship.

In March 2021, the Cambridge, Massachusetts City Council approved an ordinance amending the city's laws, stipulating that "a domestic partnership needn't only include two partners." The measure was supported by the Polyamory Legal Advocacy Coalition, also known as PLAC, composed of the Chosen Family Law Center, Harvard Law School LGBTQ+ Advocacy Clinic, and some members on the American Psychological Association's Committee on Consensual Non-Monogamy. This ordinance was originally proposed in July 2020. In April 2021, the adjacent town of Arlington, Massachusetts, approved domestic partnerships of more than two people through a motion at Town Meeting. Any motion approved at Arlington’s Town Meeting is subject to review and approval from the state Attorney General's office; by early January 2022 that office (the office of Maura Healey) approved it.

In April 2021, a British Columbia Supreme Court justice declared a woman was the third legal parent in polyamorous "triad".

Marriage implications

Most western countries do not recognize polygamous marriages, and consider bigamy a crime. Several countries also prohibit people from living a polygamous lifestyle. This is the case in some states of the United States where the criminalization of a polygamous lifestyle originated as anti-Mormon laws, although they are rarely enforced. Having multiple non-marital partners, even if married to one, is legal in most U.S. jurisdictions; at most it constitutes grounds for divorce if the spouse is non-consenting, or feels that the interest in a further partner has destabilized the marriage. In some jurisdictions, like North Carolina, a spouse can sue a third party for causing "loss of affection" in or "criminal conversation" (adultery) with their spouse, while more than twenty states in the US have laws against adultery, although they are infrequently enforced after the Supreme Court's ruling in Lawrence v. Texas (which did not explicitly hold such laws to be unconstitutional but whose reasoning clearly implies that conclusion).

Polyamory, however, is on a continuum of family-bonds that includes group marriage and it does not refer to bigamy as long as no claim to being married in formal legal terms is made. The Social History of the American Family: An Encyclopedia (2014, edited by Marilyn J. Coleman and Lawrence H. Ganong) stated that under existing U.S. federal law, a polyamorous relationship is legal in all 50 states while polygamy is not. On November 23, 2011, the Supreme Court of British Columbia ruled that the anti-polygamy law of Canada does not affect unformalized polyamorous households; this is why Polyamory Day is celebrated every year on November 23. Even so, those in polyamorous relationships often face legal challenges when it comes to custody, morality clauses, adultery and bigamy laws, housing, and where they live.

In 2012, legal scholar Deborah Anapol called for the revision of existing U.S. laws against bigamy to permit married persons to enter into additional marriages, provided that they have first given legal notice to their existing marital partner or partners, with a "dyadic networks" model. In 2015, another legal scholar, Ronald C. Den Otter, wrote in the Emory Law Journal (in the article "Three May Not Be a Crowd: The Case for a Constitutional Right to Plural Marriage") that in the United States the constitutional rights of due process and equal protection fully support marriage rights for polyamorous families.

During a PinkNews question-and-answer session in May 2015, Redfern Jon Barrett questioned Natalie Bennett, leader of the Green Party of England and Wales, about her party's stance toward polyamorous marriage rights. Bennett responded by saying that her party is "open" to discussion on the idea of civil partnership or marriages between three people. Bennett's announcement aroused media controversy on the topic and led to major international news outlets covering her answer. A follow-up article written by Barrett was published by PinkNews on May 4, 2015, further exploring the topic. 
In most countries, it is legal for three or more people to form and share a sexual relationship (subject sometimes to laws against homosexuality or adultery if two of the three are married). With only minor exceptions no developed countries permit marriage among more than two people, nor do the majority of countries give legal protection (e.g., of rights relating to children) to non-married partners. Individuals involved in polyamorous relationships are generally considered by the law to be no different from people who live together, or "date", under other circumstances. In 2017, John Alejandro Rodriguez, Victor Hugo Prada, and Manuel Jose Bermudez became Colombia's first polyamorous family to have a legally recognized relationship, though not a marriage, as by Colombian law, marriage is between two people, so they instead called it a "special patrimonial union". Some have called for domestic partnership laws to be expanded to include polyamorous couples and have said that marriage-like entitlements should apply to such couples.

In later years, in the debate over same-sex marriage, neither those for nor those against it favored polygamy itself, with agreement that multiparty marriage should remain impossible. In the case of polyamory, which is different from polygyny, there was little public debate about its existence. This is because some advocates of same-sex marriage became leery of associating with polyamory because they thought it would "give their enemies ammunition". If marriage is intended, some countries provide for both a religious marriage and a civil ceremony (sometimes combined). These recognize and formalize the relationship. Few countries outside of Africa or Asia give legal recognition to marriages with three or more partners.

Prevalence

Research into the prevalence of polyamory has been limited. A comprehensive government study of sexual attitudes, behaviors and relationships in Finland in 1992 (age 18–75, around 50% female and male) found that around 200 out of 2250 (8.9%) respondents "agreed or strongly agreed" with the statement "I could maintain several sexual relationships at the same time" and 8.2% indicated a relationship type "that best suits" at the present stage of life would involve multiple partners. By contrast, when asked about other relationships at the same time as a steady relationship, around 17% stated they had had other partners while in a steady relationship (50% no, 17% yes, 33% refused to answer).

The article What Psychology Professionals Should Know About Polyamory (by Geri Weitzman) based on a paper presented at the 8th Annual Diversity Conference in March 1999 in Albany, New York, states that while openly polyamorous relationships are relatively rare there are "indications that private polyamorous arrangements within relationships are actually quite common." They also note, citing 1983 study of 3,574 married couples in their sample that "15–28% had an understanding that allows nonmonogamy under some circumstances," with percentages are higher among "cohabitating couples (28%), lesbian couples (29%) and gay male couples (65%)." According to Jessica Fern, a psychologist and the author of Polysecure: Attachment, Trauma and Consensual Nonmonogamy, as of September 2020, about 4% of Americans, nearly 16 million people, are "practising a non-monogamous style of relationship". A study by Amy C. Moors, Amanda N. Gesselman and Justin R. Garcia published on 23 March 2021 and using a sample of 3,438 individuals has shown that 10.7% of the sample were engaged in a polyamorous relationship at some point in their life, and 16.8% reported a desire to try or be in one. The study also revelated a correlation between educational background and polyamory, showing lesser-educated male individuals were more likely to engage or having been engaged in polyamorous relationships. These findings indicate that the number of Americans who have engaged in polyamorous relationships is significantly higher than previously thought.

Notable practitioners of polyamory

 Dossie Easton, co-author of The Ethical Slut and other works
 Terisa Greenan, writer, actress, filmmaker, and creator of Family: the web series
 Laurell K. Hamilton, writer, known for Anita Blake: Vampire Hunter
 Janet Hardy, writer and sex educator, and founder of Greenery Press
 Brenda Howard, bisexual rights activist

 Willow Smith, American musician

Acceptance by religions

The Oneida Community in the 1800s in New York (a Christian religious commune) believed strongly in a system of free love known as a complex marriage, where any member was free to have sex with any other who consented. In 1993, the archives of the community were made available to scholars for the first time. Contained within the archives was the journal of Tirzah Miller, Noyes' niece, who wrote extensively about her romantic and sexual relations with other members of Oneida.

Some Christians are polyamorous, but mainstream Christianity does not accept polyamory. In 2017, the Council on Biblical Manhood and Womanhood, an evangelical Christian organization, released a manifesto on human sexuality known as the "Nashville Statement". The statement was signed by 150 evangelical leaders, and includes 14 points of belief. Among other things, it states, "We deny that God has designed marriage to be a homosexual, polygamous, or polyamorous relationship."

Some Jews are polyamorous, but mainstream Judaism does not accept polyamory. However, in 2000, Rabbi Jacob Levin came out as polyamorous to his synagogue's board in California without losing his job as rabbi. As well, in his book A Guide to Jewish Practice: Volume 1 – Everyday Living (2011), Rabbi David Teutsch wrote, "It is not obvious that monogamy is automatically a morally higher form of relationship than polygamy," and that if practiced with honesty, flexibility, egalitarian rules, and trust, practitioners may "live enriched lives as a result". In 2013, Sharon Kleinbaum, the senior rabbi at Congregation Beit Simchat Torah in New York, said that polyamory is a choice that does not preclude a Jewishly observant and socially conscious life. Some polyamorous Jews point to biblical patriarchs having multiple wives and concubines as evidence that polyamorous relationships can be sacred in Judaism. An email list is dedicated to polyamorous Jews; it is called AhavaRaba, which roughly translates to "big love" in Hebrew, and which echoes God's "great" or "abounding" love mentioned in the Ahava rabbah prayer.

LaVeyan Satanism is critical of Abrahamic sexual mores, considering them narrow, restrictive and hypocritical. Satanists are pluralists, accepting polyamorists, bisexuals, lesbians, gays, BDSM, transgender people, and asexuals. Sex is viewed as an indulgence, but one that should only be freely entered into with consent. The Eleven Satanic Rules of the Earth only give two instructions regarding sex: "Do not make sexual advances unless you are given the mating signal" and "Do not harm little children", though the latter is much broader and encompasses physical and other abuse. This has always been a consistent part of CoS policy since its inception in 1966. Magister Peter H. Gillmore wrote in an essay supporting same-sex marriage that some people try to suggest that their attitude on sexuality is "anything goes" even though they have a principle of "responsibility to the responsible". He also stated that the Church of Satan's philosophy "strictly forbids sexual activity with children as well as with non-human animals."

Unitarian Universalists for Polyamory Awareness, founded in 2001, has engaged in ongoing education and advocacy for greater understanding and acceptance of polyamory within the Unitarian Universalist Association. At the 2014 General Assembly, two UUPA members moved to include the category of "family and relationship structures" in the UUA's nondiscrimination rule, along with other amendments; the package of proposed amendments was ratified by the GA delegates.

Acceptance by non-religious organizations
In 2018, the Association of Humanistic Rabbis issued "A Statement on Sexual Ethics for the 21st Century", which states in part, "We commit to the freedom and empowerment of all adults to full consensual sexual expression, be it monogamous or polyamorous."

In a clinical setting
In 2002, a paper titled Working with polyamorous clients in the clinical setting (by Joy Davidson) addressed various areas of inquiry. This included the importance of talking about alternatives to monogamy, how therapists can work with those who are exploring polyamory, basic understandings of polyamory, and key issues that therapists need to watch for in the course of working with polyamorous clients.

Its conclusions were that "Sweeping changes are occurring in the sexual and relational landscape" (including "dissatisfaction with limitations of serial monogamy, i.e. exchanging one partner for another in the hope of a better outcome"); that clinicians need to start by "recognizing the array of possibilities that 'polyamory' encompasses" and "examine our culturally-based assumption that 'only monogamy is acceptable'" and how this bias impacts on the practice of therapy; the need for self-education about polyamory, basic understandings about the "rewards of the poly lifestyle" and the common social and relationship challenges faced by those involved, and the "shadow side" of polyamory, the potential existing for coercion, strong emotions in opposition, and jealousy. The paper also states that the configurations a therapist would be "most likely to see in practice" are individuals involved in primary-plus arrangements, monogamous couples wishing to explore non-monogamy for the first time, and "poly singles".

In 2002, the rights of polyamorous people were added to the mission of the National Coalition for Sexual Freedom, an American sex-positive advocacy and educational organization; a manual for psychotherapists who deal with polyamorous clients was published by them in September 2009, called What Psychotherapists Should Know About Polyamory (written by Geri Weitzman and others).

The National Coalition for Sexual Freedom manages the Kink And Poly Aware Professionals Directory, which consists of an Internet directory of psychotherapeutic, medical, and other professionals who have volunteered to be contacted by people who are involved in polyamory (and/or BDSM, etc).

The Polyamory-Friendly Professionals Directory is a directory on the Internet “of professionals who are sensitive to the unique needs of polyamorous clientele”; it includes psychologists, therapists, medical professionals, and other professionals.

Media representation

1980s to 2000s 

Starfire, also known as Princess Koriand'r, is a fictional superhero appearing in books published by DC Comics, who debuted in a preview story inserted within DC Comics Presents #26 (October 1980) and was created by Marv Wolfman and George Pérez; she was shown to be a polyamorous character. Starfire was raised on the world of Tamaran where it was acceptable to have an open marriage. Some critics argue that after arriving on Earth, she remained sex-positive and free-thinking, remaining open to polygamous relationships, open sex, and pansexual "free-love" with anyone, often leading to conflict with Earth's more reserved culture and customs. For Starfire, polyamory was a personal and cultural preference.

In 1989, the anime series Ranma ½ included a polyamorous character, Tatewaki, who is in love with both Akane and the "Pigtail Girl" (Ranma's female form) and proposes to date both, but they do not return his feelings.

In 2002, the Futurama episode "A Taste of Freedom" showed Old Man Waterfall, who is Zoidberg's defense attorney until killed by a giant crab warship, having seven wives and one husband. While Waterfall's case for Zoidberg is unsuccessful, the Supreme Court holds polygamy as legal, though this leads to jeers from spectators. The made-for-TV Futurama film, The Beast with a Billion Backs (published 2008), featured two polyamorous characters: Colleen O'Hallahan and Yivo. Colleen had five boyfriends, Fry, Chu, Ndulu, Schlomo and Bolt Rolands, while Yivo is a planet-sized alien with no determinable gender, dating, then marrying all people of the universe at once. Fry and Colleen eventually break up. Afterwards, Yivo remains in a relationship with Colleen.

The 21st century brought various new forms of representation of polyamory. In 2007, Daniel Help Justice's book Dreyd featured Tarsa, a priestess, warrior, and bisexual woman, as part of a polyamorous love triad.  In 2009, Graham Nicholls founded www.polyamory.org.uk, the United Kingdom's first website about polyamory and the Mom of Pina in Maria Pallotta-Chiarolli's novel, Love You Two was shown to be polyamorous and bisexual, leading Pina on a journey to explore the "complex spectrum of sex and love" in humanity itself. In 2010, the series Lost Girl began. It included Bo Dennis, a bisexual succubus which must sustain herself by feeding from the life force of male and female Fae and humans, via oral intake or the energy created through sex. In the first two seasons she was involved romantically with Dyson (a heterosexual shapeshifter) and Lauren (a lesbian human). Later on, Bo tried to have a monogamous relationship with Lauren, with Bo and Lauren remaining in love with each other through ups and downs, and later accepting each other as a couple by the end of the series.

Increased representation in the 2010s

Polyamorous characters appeared in various media in the 2010s. In the 2010 television show Caprica, several main characters are portrayed as being in a polyfidelitous-style marriage consisting of multiple men and women, with each member being equal socially and legally. From 2012 to 2013, the American reality television series on the American pay television network Showtime, Polyamory: Married & Dating, was broadcast. It followed polyamorous families as they navigated the challenges presented by polyamory. Around the same time, the webcomic Kimchi Cuddles began, which portrayed polyamorous people like other characters, "only with more partners to steal their blankets." The following years featured a polyamorous captain in Jacqueline Koyanagi's novel, Ascension, and three characters (Reese, David, and Amber) in a relationship in Malinda Lo's novel, Inheritance. In 2011, American Horror Story: Hotel began, with Countess Elizabeth Johnson, played by Lady Gaga, beginning a relationship with famed film actor Rudolph Valentino and his wife, Natacha Rambova, as seen in episode seven. The following year, the YouTube show The Gay and Wondrous Life of Caleb Gallo would show a couple working through their decision to convert from monogamy to polyamory, like Brian Jordan Alvarez, who considers himself polyamorous.

From 2015 to 2017, in the webcomic Always Human by Ari North, the parents of Sunati (Nisa and Prav) were shown to be in a polyamorous relationship with a man named Vish, who Nisa calls "our boyfriend". In another webcomic, Unknown Lands, which began in 2015, Vard is shown to be polyamorous, along with most of the cast having a queer sexual identity. The webcomic itself has environmental, feminist, and LGBTQ+ themes. A few years later, the 2017 film Professor Marston and the Wonder Women focuses on a polyamorous relationship between a professor, his wife, and their student, Olive, as they share a "workplace, a bed, a home and eventually a family." Furthermore, fiction writer Cassandra Clare stated that Mark Blackthorn in The Dark Artifices book series would "definitely be open to a polyamorous relationship", but would not cheat or lie, while noting that another such relationship between other characters would not be possible. Eventually, he ends up in a polyamorous triangle, with a girlfriend and a boyfriend who are dating each other. Additionally, writer K. Ancrum confirmed that polyamorous characters were in two of her books (The Wicker King and The Weight of the Stars), but did not name any specific characters. At the same time, Em, best friend of the protagonist in two books by Leigh Matthews (Don't Bang the Barista and Go Deep) is a bisexual woman dating a man in the first book, but by the second book she has "happily settled into a poly triad", wondering how she will get married.

On May 29, 2017, in the last season of Steven Universe, Fluorite, a member of the Off Colors, a fusion of six different gems into one being, with fusion as the physical manifestation of a relationship, was introduced. This character reappeared in various episodes in the show's fifth season ("Lars Head", "Lars of the Stars", "Your Mother and Mine"), the season 5 finale, "Change Your Mind", along with one in Steven Universe Future ("Little Graduation") and in Steven Universe: The Movie, with the latter two as non-speaking appearances. The series creator, Rebecca Sugar, confirmed that Fluorite is a representation of a polyamorous relationship at the show's Comic Con panel in San Diego. Sugar said at the panel, and at another conference, that she was inspired after talking with children at an LGBTQ+ center in Long Beach, California, who wanted a polyamorous character in the show. Steven Universe was not alone in this regard. The fourth season of BoJack Horseman, a mature animated series, featured a character named Hollyhock, the sister of the protagonist, who has eight adoptive fathers in a polyamorous gay relationship. The same year, Unicornland premiered, with eight-episode web series focusing on Annie's exploration into polyamory after her divorce.

2018–present

Polyamory was the subject of the 2018 Louis Theroux documentary Love Without Limits, where Theroux travels to Portland, Oregon, to meet a number of people engaged in polyamorous relationships. Also in 2018, 195 Lewis, a web series about a black lesbian couple dealing with their relationship being newly polyamorous, received the Breakthrough Series – Short Form award from the Gotham Awards. The series premiered in 2017 and ran for five episodes. The same year, the comic Open Earth premiered. The comic is set in the future and monogamous relationships are seen as outdated to all the young people on board the space station, all who are polyamorous. Author Sarah Mirk said that she wanted to write a story where "open relationships can be really positive and wonderful" and said that its realistic to believe that people would "explore multiple relationships". She also said she wanted to write a story where it was "totally normal to be queer and genderqueer."

Trigonometry is an eight-part BBC TV drama series which started on March 25, 2020, and is about an existing couple being joined by a third person and forming a polyamorous relationship. The BBC said that Trigonometry is "A love story about three people who are made for each other." In July 2021, Australian soap opera Neighbours explored polyamory with three of its main characters. Actress Jacinta Stapleton was proud to be involved in the story arc, stating: "I think we should always try to reflect real intimate relationships in our society. Polyamory certainly is a part of that. The more we represent the beautifully diverse nature and uniqueness of humans, the more people will feel accepted and seen."

In the 3rd season of the Netflix TV show You, a sub-plot concerning polyamory is included, depicting two secondary characters who are self-proclaimed polyamorists, and attempting to engage with the show's main protagonists, Joe and Love. However, leaders in the polyamory community have pointed out that the characters in the show are actually swingers, and the show misrepresents the polyamory culture significantly, as well as presenting a very negative image of those who practice it.

Polyamory-related observances

Metamour Day is celebrated every year on February 28. It celebrates the relationships people have with their metamours (partners' other significant others, often referred to as metamours or OSOs.)

Polyamory Pride Day is celebrated every year on a day in Pride Month.

Polyamory groups sometimes participate in pride parades.

International Solo Polyamory Day is celebrated every year on September 24. Solo polyamory is a type of polyamory in which an individual has or is comfortable with having multiple intimate (romantic or sexual) relationships without wanting to cohabit or "nest" with any one partner, eschewing the "relationship escalator" which holds that relationships must follow a progression, or "escalator" from dating, to being exclusive, to becoming engaged, getting married and having children.

Polyamory Day is celebrated every year on November 23; that day was chosen because on November 23, 2011, the Supreme Court of British Columbia ruled that the anti-polygamy law of Canada does not affect unformalized polyamorous households.

Polyamory rights organizations

The Canadian Polyamory Advocacy Association (CPAA) was founded in 2009. It "advocates on behalf of Canadians who practice polyamory. It [also] promotes legal, social, government, and institutional acceptance and support of polyamory, and advances the interests of the Canadian polyamorous community generally."

The Organization for Polyamory and Ethical Non-monogamy (OPEN) was founded in the United States in 2022 as “a nonprofit organization dedicated to normalizing and empowering non-monogamous individuals and communities.”

The Polyamory Action Lobby (PAL) was founded in 2013 in Australia to fight cultural misconceptions about polyamorous people and to fight for their legal rights.

The Polyamory Legal Advocacy Coalition (PLAC), based in the United States, "seeks to advance the civil and human rights of polyamorous individuals, communities, and families through legislative advocacy, public policy, and public education."

Unitarian Universalists for Polyamory Awareness (UUPA) was founded in 2001. It "has as its mission to serve the Unitarian Universalist Association and the community of polyamorous people within and outside the UUA by providing support, promoting education, and encouraging spiritual wholeness regarding polyamory."

Criticism
Yasmin Nair, a co-founder of Against Equality, an anti-capitalist collective of radical queer and trans writers, thinkers, and artists, criticized polyamory. She argued that polyamory does not make someone radical, and said that the discourse around polyamory is tiring and not liberating, only fetishizing a "peculiar form of monogamy...and long-term relationships". Julie Bindel also penned a criticism in The Guardian, saying that  "co-opting and rebranding of polygamy" is disturbing, while saying that "modern proponents of polyamory "tend to ignore gender-dynamics" and called polyamory the choice of "overwhelmingly white, affluent, university-educated, and privileged folk". The conservative National Review claimed that "widespread acceptance of polyamory could make society worse off" with supposed false notions of honesty. Conor Friedersdorf of The Atlantic said that while he would welcome a polyamorous family as neighbors, it would not make sense to call their arrangement a civil marriage with the entitlements and rights that came with it.

Scientific study of psychological well-being and relationship satisfaction for participants in polyamory has been limited due to mostly being a "hidden population". While some results could be interpreted as positive, these findings often suffer from bias and methodological issues. A significant number of studies rely on small samples, often recruited from referrals, snowball-sampling, and websites devoted to polyamory. Individuals recruited in this manner tend to be relatively homogeneous in terms of values, beliefs, and demographics, which limits the generalizability of the findings. These samples also tend to be self-selecting toward individuals with positive experiences, whereas those who found polyamory to be distressing or hurtful might be more reluctant to participate in the research. Most of the studies rely entirely on self-report measures. Generally, self-reports of the degree of well-being and relationship satisfaction over time are flawed, and are often based on belief rather than actual experience. Self-report measures are also at risk of self-enhancement bias, as subjects may feel pressure to give positive responses about their well-being and relationship satisfaction in the face of stereotype threat. This disparity was noted by Amy C. Moors, Terri D. Conley, Robin S. Edelstein, and William J. Chopik (2014); who compared respondents expressing interest in consensual non-monogamy drawn from the general population to those drawn from online communities devoted to discussing positive aspects of non-monogamy. In particular, it was noted that individuals with inclinations toward consensual non-monogamy in the general population sample were robustly correlated with having an avoidant attachment pattern.

See also

Notes

References

Further reading

External links

Polyamory-related media
TEDx Talk: Polyamory

Polyamory-related media coverage
 Polyamory in the News (2005–present)

Research and articles
 The Kenneth R. Haslam Collection on Polyamory hosted at the Kinsey Institute for Research in Sex, Gender, and Reproduction includes a wide variety of materials related to polyamory, along with research data.
 Polyamory Bibliography from the Kinsey Institute.

{{Navboxes
|list =

 
Interpersonal relationships
Intimate relationships
Love
Sexual fidelity
Sexuality and society